Comunica2 (also known as Comunica2.0) it is an annual international congress on social networks, communication and digital marketing organised by the Universitat Politècnica of València. The event has gathered in his 6 editions professionals of media, social networks and experts in communication and digital marketing, as well as journalists and experts in writing for the Internet .

Comunica2 is an academic conference, and every year receives scientific and professional communications. The congress has a scientific committee with professors from Spanish universities and an honour committee with representatives from the Universitat Politècnica of València, the City council of Gandia and the Fundéu BBVA foundation.

Location 
The congress has been celebrated in Gandia since 2010.

Past editions 
 First edition (2010)
 Second edition (2011)
 Third edition (2013): Escribir en internet
 Fourth edition (2014)
 Fifth edition (2015)
 Sixth edition (2016)

Next editions 
 Seventh edition (2017)

References 

Academic conferences